These are the results of the men's C-1 slalom competition in canoeing at the 1996 Summer Olympics. The C-1 (canoe single) event is raced by one-man canoes through a whitewater course. The venue for the 1996 Olympic competition was on the Toccoa/Ocoee River near the Georgia-Tennessee state line.

Medalists

Results
The 30 competitors each took two runs through the whitewater slalom course on July 27. The best time of the two runs counted for the event.

References

1996 Summer Olympics official report Volume 3. p. 163. 
1996 men's C-1 results
Wallechinsky, David and Jaime Loucky (2008). "Canoeing: Men's Canadian Slalom Singles". In The Complete Book of the Olympics: 2008 Edition. London: Aurum Press Limited. p. 486.

Men's Slalom C-1
Men's events at the 1996 Summer Olympics